Bowland-with-Leagram is a civil parish in Ribble Valley, Lancashire, England. It contains twelve listed buildings that are recorded in the National Heritage List for England. All of the listed buildings are designated at Grade II, the lowest of the three grades, which is applied to "buildings of national importance and special interest". The parish is entirely rural. All but one of the listed buildings are farmhouses or farm buildings, the other building being a bridge.

Buildings

References

Citations

Sources

Lists of listed buildings in Lancashire
Buildings and structures in Ribble Valley